Meet the Press is a weekly American television Sunday morning talk show broadcast on NBC. It is the longest-running program on American television, though the current format bears little resemblance to the debut episode on November 6, 1947. Meet the Press specializes in interviews with leaders in Washington, D.C., across the country, and around the world on issues of politics, economics, foreign policy, and other public affairs, along with panel discussions that provide opinions and analysis. In January 2021, production moved to NBC's bureau on Capitol Hill in Washington, D.C.

The longevity of Meet the Press is attributable in part to the fact that the program debuted during what was only the second official "network television season" for American television. It was the first live television network news program on which a sitting president of the United States appeared; this occurred on its broadcast on November 9, 1975, which featured Gerald Ford. The program has been hosted by 12 moderators, beginning with creator Martha Rountree. The show's moderator since 2014 has been Chuck Todd, who also serves as political director for NBC News.

The hour-long program airs in most markets on Sundays at 10:30 a.m. live in the Eastern Time Zone and on tape delay elsewhere. Meet the Press is also occasionally pre-empted by network coverage of sports events held outside the U.S. The program is also rebroadcast on Mondays at 4:00 a.m. Eastern Time on MSNBC, whose audio feed is also simulcast on Sirius/XM Satellite Radio. The program is syndicated by Westwood One to various radio stations around the United States, and is on C-SPAN Radio as part of its replays of the Sunday morning talk shows.

Format
The program's format consists of an extended one-on-one interview with the host, and is sometimes followed by a roundtable discussion or one-on-two interview with figures in adversarial positions, either Congressional members from opposite sides of the aisle or political commentators. A half-hour program for the first 45 years of its history, the show was expanded to 60 minutes starting with the broadcast on September 20, 1992.

The program also features in-depth examinations of facts behind political and general news stories (particularly as part of a segment called the "Data Download", introduced after Chuck Todd assumed duties as moderator, which is conducted on a touchscreen within the main set).

History

Meet the Press began on radio on the Mutual Broadcasting System in 1945 as American Mercury Presents: Meet the Press, a program to promote The American Mercury, a magazine that Lawrence Spivak purchased in 1935. Before the program aired, Spivak asked journalist Martha Rountree, who had worked in radio and had been employed by Spivak as a roving editor for the magazine, to critique the plans for the new radio show. Based on her advice, Rountree created a new radio program that she called The American Mercury, on October 5, 1945.

On November 6, 1947, while still on the Mutual Broadcasting System, the television rights to the program were purchased by General Foods, which began to air the show on the NBC television network with the title shortened to simply Meet the Press; the radio version also adopted the new name. Although some sources credit Spivak with the program's creation, Rountree developed the idea on her own, and Spivak joined as co-producer and business partner in the enterprise after the show had already debuted.

Meet the Press was originally presented as a 30-minute press conference with a single guest and a panel of questioners. Its first guest was James Farley, who served as Postmaster General, Democratic National Committee chairman and campaign manager to Franklin Delano Roosevelt under the first two terms of the New Deal Administration. Creator Rountree served as its first host, the program's only female moderator to date. She stepped down on November 1, 1953, and was succeeded by Ned Brooks, who remained as moderator until his retirement on December 26, 1965. Spivak became the moderator on January 1, 1966, moving up from his role as a permanent panelist. He retired on November 9, 1975, on a special one-hour edition that featured a sitting president as guest for the first time, in this case Gerald Ford. The next week, Bill Monroe, previously a weekly panelist like Spivak had been years before, took over as moderator and stayed until June 2, 1984.

For the next seven and a half years, the program then went through a series of hosts as it struggled in the ratings against ABC's This Week with David Brinkley. Roger Mudd and Marvin Kalb, as co-moderators, followed Monroe for a year, followed by Chris Wallace (who would later go on to a much longer run as host of the rival program Fox News Sunday) from 1987 to 1988. Garrick Utley, then hosting Weekend Today, concurrently hosted Meet the Press from 1989 through December 1, 1991. All this occurred despite the increasing ratings of NBC News' other programs (and those of the network generally) during that period. The program originally aired at noon Eastern Time every Sunday, acting as an awkward lead-in program to the then-half-hour NFL Live pre-game show in the fall and early winter, before moving to a 9:00 a.m. slot by the early 1990s when Meet the Press expanded to an hour.

Under Russert

Network officials, concerned for the show's future, turned to Tim Russert, the network's bureau chief in Washington, D.C. He took over as moderator of Meet the Press on December 8, 1991, and remained with the program until his death on June 13, 2008, becoming the longest-serving moderator in the program's history.

Under Russert, the program was expanded to one hour and became less of a televised press conference, focusing more on Russert's questions and comments; Russert also engaged in longer in-depth interviews and hosted panels of experts to discuss the topics featured in that week's broadcast. Russert signed off each edition by saying, "That's all for today. We'll be back next week. If it's Sunday, it's Meet the Press."

During the professional football season, Russert, a native of Buffalo, New York, and an avid fan of the Buffalo Bills, sometimes added, "Go Bills!," and occasionally would ask panelists, "How 'bout those Sabres?" if Buffalo's NHL hockey team was doing well. Spoofs of the show featured in a recurring sketch on Saturday Night Live often reflected his impromptu additions in support of the two professional sports franchises. By 2006, Meet the Press was the highest-rated program among the Sunday morning talk shows.

On June 13, 2008, Russert died of a sudden coronary thrombosis (caused by a cholesterol plaque rupture). Former NBC Nightly News anchor Tom Brokaw hosted a special edition of Meet the Press dedicated to the life of Russert on June 15, 2008, in which Russert's chair was left empty as a tribute.

Guest moderators
Andrea Mitchell (August 15, 2004)

After Russert
Mark Whitaker was named by NBC News as the division's Washington, D.C. Bureau Chief and was given "executive oversight" of Meet the Press.

Interim Brokaw era
NBC Nightly News anchor Brian Williams acted as moderator of the first show following the tribute to Russert on June 15, 2008, with the same guests and subject matter that Russert was planning for when he died.

Following Russert's death, Tom Brokaw was named the interim moderator through the 2008 general elections. Brokaw followed Russert's tradition by signing off with "We'll be back next Sunday because if it's Sunday, it's Meet the Press" (a sign-off that continues to be used by his successors as moderator). In September of that year, the show was presented with limited commercial interruption.

On August 10, 2008, David Gregory moderated the panel discussion during the second half-hour of the broadcast, while Brokaw anchored the first half-hour from the site of the Summer Olympics in Beijing. The following week on August 17, 2008, he moderated the entire broadcast. On December 1, 2008, it was also reported that the December 7 broadcast would be Brokaw's last, with Gregory becoming the new permanent host the following Sunday.

Under Gregory
David Gregory began his tenure as moderator on December 14, 2008. Four days after Gregory's first regular broadcast, on December 18, 2008, NBC News political director Chuck Todd was named contributing editor of Meet the Press. Throughout Gregory's tenure as moderator, Meet the Press experienced significant ratings declines. In the final three months of 2013, the program placed third among the Sunday morning talk shows in total viewership, behind CBS's Face the Nation and ABC's This Week, for the first time since 1992. It also experienced the lowest ratings in the show's entire history among the key 25-to-54 age viewing demographic during this period. NBC management became uncertain as to the future direction of the program.

A new set was introduced on May 2, 2010, featuring video screens and library-style bookshelves; Gregory would preview the guests to be featured during each week's broadcast using a large video screen. Different, modified intro music was also introduced, with the Meet the Press theme music in a shorter "modernized [style]...the beginning repeated with drum beats" (see "High-definition broadcasting" below for additional information).

Under Todd

In response to declining viewership, rumors surfaced in August 2014 that Gregory would be replaced as the program's moderator. NBC News President Deborah Turness apparently had held discussions with Jon Stewart (then-host of Comedy Central's news comedy program The Daily Show) to replace Gregory, which Stewart later confirmed in a Rolling Stone interview, saying, "My guess is they were casting as wide and as weird a net as they could. I'm sure part of them was thinking, 'Why don't we just make it a variety show?

On August 14, 2014, Turness announced that Chuck Todd, NBC's chief White House correspondent, would take over the role of moderator on September 7, 2014. Because of Todd's Dodger fanhood, a Los Angeles Dodger poster became part of the physical format.

Meet the Press Now
On September 28, 2015, MSNBC premiered MTP Daily, a weekday spin-off also hosted by Todd. It formally replaced The Ed Show as MSNBC's early-evening program after a transitional period following its cancellation. MSNBC explained that the program is meant to "bring the insight and power of Meet the Press to our air every day of the week". By 2022, the show was airing in the 1 PM Eastern slot, and in May it was announced that the show would be moving from MSNBC to the free streaming platform NBC News NOW, and rechristened Meet the Press Now, starting June 6. The show also returned to an early evening slot of 4PM Eastern.

Disinformation overtaking media
In a December 2019 interview with Rolling Stone, Todd discussed how disinformation overtook the media during the Trump administration. However, PressThink, a project of the Arthur L. Carter Journalism Institute at New York University, took Todd to task for failing to address the issue as it unfolded, in a very detailed discussion of Todd's remarks.

High-definition broadcasting
The set utilized from March 17, 1996, to April 25, 2010, had been designed as an experimental set for high-definition broadcasting; several editions of the program (including the first broadcast of a regular series on a major television network in HD) had aired in the format in the 1990s over experimental HD station WHD-TV in Washington, D.C. Despite this, the program continued to be transmitted in NTSC over the NBC network itself. On May 2, 2010, Meet the Press became the last NBC News program to convert to high definition, and unveiled a new set consisting of large video screens mostly used to display Washington scenery, satellite interview subjects and moderator and subject talking points, along with graphics produced for the format.

In January 2021, production of the program moved from WRC-TV facilities in Tenleytown to a ground floor studio in NBC's new Washington D.C. bureau on Capitol Hill. The move included a new set.

Moderators 
The following is the list of moderators for Meet the Press:

Notable guests and events

 First guest: James A. Farley, the former Postmaster General of the United States and former Democratic National Committee Chair.
 Whittaker Chambers states Alger Hiss was a communist on the radio broadcast on August 27, 1948, which leads to libel suit from Hiss, the Pumpkin Papers, and Justice's indictment of Hiss by December 1948.
 First female guest: Elizabeth Bentley, a courier for a Communist spy ring, on September 12, 1948. 
 An interview with Fidel Castro aired April 19, 1959.
 An interview with Martin Luther King Jr., about the civil rights movement in the United States.
 Every U.S. president since John F. Kennedy has appeared on Meet the Press, although not necessarily during their presidency. Jimmy Carter used his appearance on January 20, 1980, to announce the United States' boycott of the 1980 Summer Olympics. Ronald Reagan appeared seven times before being elected president, but did not appear during his presidency. Bill Clinton was the guest for the 50th anniversary broadcast on November 9, 1997. The interview with George W. Bush was conducted in the Oval Office at the White House on February 8, 2004. The interview was held with then President-elect Barack Obama on December 7, 2008. Donald Trump has appeared on the program a number of times, most recently in June 2019.
 The first live communications satellite television interview occurred on Meet the Press on September 19, 1965, with the British Prime Minister Harold Wilson.
 A special edition of the program aired on Christmas Day 2022 to commemorate its 75th anniversary, consisting entirely of clips from the program archives and brief introductory commentaries by Todd.

Distribution
In addition to its broadcasts on NBC, Meet the Press also airs on various other NBCUniversal-owned channels domestically and internationally, including MSNBC, NBC News Now, CNBC Europe in Europe and CNBC Asia in Asia. It is also broadcast in Australia on the Seven Network and in the Philippines on 9TV.

Meet the Press is also available as an audio or video podcast, and is simulcast on radio stations by Westwood One (which also handles distribution of all other NBC-produced radio programming, including NBC News Radio).

See also
The Mission (theme music)

References and footnotes

External links

 
 

1947 American television series debuts
1940s American television series
1950s American television series
1960s American television series
1970s American television series
1980s American television series
1990s American television series
2000s American television series
2010s American television series
2020s American television series
1940s American television talk shows
1950s American television talk shows
1960s American television talk shows
1970s American television talk shows
1980s American television talk shows
1990s American television talk shows
2000s American television talk shows
2010s American television talk shows
2020s American television talk shows
1940s American television news shows
1950s American television news shows
1960s American television news shows
1970s American television news shows
1980s American television news shows
1990s American television news shows
2000s American television news shows
2010s American television news shows
2020s American television news shows
American news radio programs
Black-and-white American television shows
English-language television shows
NBC original programming
NBC News
Peabody Award-winning television programs
American Sunday morning talk shows
Television series based on radio series
Television series by Universal Television
Television shows filmed in Washington, D.C.
Mutual Broadcasting System programs
NBC radio programs